Social Science History is a quarterly peer-reviewed academic journal. It is the official journal of the Social Science History Association. Its articles bring an analytic, theoretical, and often quantitative approach to historical evidence. Its editors-in-chief are Anne McCants (Massachusetts Institute of Technology) and Kris Inwood of Guelph University.

History 
The first issue came out in the fall of 1976. The journal's founders intended to "improve the quality of historical explanation" with "theories and methods from the social science disciplines" and to make generalizations across historical cases.  The journal was first published by the University Center for International Studies at the University of Pittsburgh then starting in the 1980s by Duke University Press.  Starting in 2015 the publisher is Cambridge University Press.

Lawsuit with publisher 
The Social Science History Association invited bids from publishers and told the Duke University Press in June 2012 of its intent to end the agreement for the press to publish Social Science History.  The association planned to seek another publisher.  Duke asserted it owned the title of the journal, though not the copyright for its contents.  In March 2013 the association sued the press for copyright infringement. When the case was resolved the association was able to switch publishers.

Abstracting and indexing
The journal is abstracted and indexed in:

 Academic Search Elite
 Academic Search Premier
 America: History and Life
 Arts and Humanities Citation Index
 Current Contents/Arts and Humanities
 Historical Abstracts
 International Bibliography of Periodical Literature (IBZ)
 International Political Science Abstracts
 Scopus, Social Sciences Citation Index
 SocINDEX
 SocINFO
 Sociological Abstracts

According to the Journal Citation Reports, the journal has a 2021 impact factor of 0.954.

References

External links
 
 Social Science History Association 

Publications established in 1976
Social history journals
Political science journals
Quarterly journals
Duke University Press academic journals
Cambridge University Press academic journals
English-language journals